Guiomar Maristany Zuleta de Reales (born 19 February 1999) is a Spanish tennis player.

Maristany has a career-high WTA singles ranking of world No. 296, achieved on 18 July 2022. On 30 January 2023, she peaked at No. 287 in the WTA doubles rankings. She has won six singles and four doubles titles on the ITF Women's Circuit.

Career
In August 2018, she played the final of the $25k tournament in Las Palmas, Spain where she lost to Başak Eraydın.

In March 2022, Maristany became the champion in Palma Nova, Spain by defeating Argentine Solana Sierra. In May, she won her fifth career singles title by defeating compatriot Jéssica Bouzas Maneiro in the final. She played a $25k final in Madrid in June.

At the end of June, she won gold medals in singles and doubles at the Mediterranean Games in Oran, Algeria. She defeated in the finals Italian Nuria Brancaccio in singles, and, alongside Jéssica Bouzas Maneiro, Maltese Francesca Curmi and Elaine Genovese.

ITF finals

Singles: 9 (6 titles, 3 runner–ups)

Doubles: 8 (4 titles, 4 runner–ups)

National representation

Multi-sports event
Maristany made her debut representing Spain in multi-sports event at the 2022 Mediterranean Games, she won the women's singles and the doubles gold medal.

Singles: 1 (gold)

Doubles: 1 (gold)

References

External links
 
 

1999 births
Living people
Spanish female tennis players
Mediterranean Games gold medalists for Spain
Competitors at the 2022 Mediterranean Games
Mediterranean Games medalists in tennis
20th-century Spanish women
21st-century Spanish women